Jacob Faye-Lund (born 15 September 1994) is a Norwegian football goalkeeper who plays for Oppsal.

He played for Oppsal in his early career, and joined Lillestrøm's B team from Vålerenga's youth team ahead of the 2012 season. He made his senior debut in the Norwegian Premier League as a substitute in a 3-0 victory against Strømsgodset in April 2012. He became Lillestrøm's youngest goalkeeper in the club's first-tier history.

Early August 2013, he signed for Fram Larvik. He made his debut 11 August 2013 against Odd 2, winning the match 9-0.

Following a hiatus from football in 2017 he rejoined Oppsal in 2018, helping the team lead the 2018 3. divisjon campaign.

Career statistics

Personal life
He is the older brother of fellow goalkeeper Julian Faye Lund.

References

1994 births
Living people
Footballers from Oslo
Norwegian footballers
Lillestrøm SK players
Eliteserien players

Association football goalkeepers